About Fifty (also known as Fifty-nothing) is a 2011 independent comedy film written by Thomas Johnston and Drew Pillsbury. It stars Wendie Malick, Michaela McManus, Anne-Marie Johnson, Jessalyn Gilsig, Martin Grey, Drew Pillsbury, and Kathleen Noone.  It premiered January 7, 2011 at the Palm Springs International Film Festival.

Screen Media Films acquired the film for a November release under the new title About Fifty.

Cast
 Wendie Malick as Kate
 Michaela McManus as Alix
 Anne-Marie Johnson as Erin
 Jessalyn Gilsig as Jessica
 Kathleen Noone as Peggy
 Steve Hytner as Larry
 Miriam Flynn as Nancy
 Audrey Wasilewski as Becca
 Rebecca Field as Michelle
 Garrett Strommen as Dan
 Martin Grey as Adam
 Drew Pillsbury as Jon

References

External links 
 
 

2011 films
2011 romantic comedy films

American independent films
American romantic comedy films
2010s English-language films
Films set in Palm Springs, California
2011 independent films
2010s American films